The Security of the Sovereign Act (1 Geo. I. St. 2, c. 13.) was a 1714 Act of the Parliament of the United Kingdom. The Act required all civil and military officers; members of colleges; teachers; preachers; and lawyers to take the oaths of allegiance and supremacy and of abjuration of the Pretender.

See also
Treason Act 1714

References

Great Britain Acts of Parliament 1714